The 2nd Rowan County Regiment was first established in October 22, 1775 as a local militia in Rowan County in the Province of North-Carolina. This regiment was created from the existing Rowan County Regiment of militia.   Its original officers were Col Adlai Osborne, Lt Col Christopher Beekman, and Major Charles McDowell.  Adlai Osborne was a leader in Rowan County and member of the Rowan County Committee of Safety.  On May 9, 1777, the regiment was renamed the Burke County Regiment, which was active until the end of the Revolutionary War in 1783.

History

First Instance of 2nd Rowan County Regiment
The 2nd Rowan County Regiment was initially established on October 22, 1775 as an off-shoot of the Rowan County Regiment when the 1st and 2nd Rowan County Regiments were established.  Most of the original officers of the Rowan County Regiment were assigned to the 1st Rowan County Regiment.   The 2nd Rowan County Regiment's initial assignment was to march to the coast of North Carolina to support the Battle of Moore's Creek Bridge.   The regiment marched to Cross Creek and found out that they were too late for the battle, so they turned around and headed home.  The Regiment saw action only at McDowell's Station and the Cherokee Expedition in 1776.  McDowell's station was located at Quaker Meadows along the upper Catawba River in western Rowan County, near present-day Morganton.  Ten men from the regiment, under command of Lieutenant Colonel Charles McDowell, defended 120 local settlers from attack by the Cherokee.   This was a prelude to the Cherokee Expedition that involved additional troops from both the 1st and 2nd Rowan County regiments.

Known senior officers are listed below for the 2nd Rowan County Regiment (October 22, 1775 – May 9, 1777):
Col. Adlai Osborne
Col. Christopher Beekman
Col. William Sharpe
Maj. (also Lt Col.) Charles McDowell
John Davidson, Pack Horse Master (1776)
James Greenlee - Wagon Master (1776)

Burke County Regiment instance
On May 9, 1777, the regiment was renamed the Burke County Regiment, which was active until the end of the Revolutionary War in 1783.  In 1777, Burke County was formed from Rowan County. It was named for Thomas Burke, then serving as a delegate to the Continental Congress (1777 to 1781).

As Burke County Regiment (May 9, 1777 – May 1, 1782) the senior officers were:
Lt. Col. William Armstrong
Lt. Col. Christopher Beekman
Lt. Col. James Brittain
Lt. Col. Charles McDowell
1st Maj. Hugh Brevard
2nd Maj. George Wilfong (also adjutant in 1775)
Maj. Joseph McDowell

Second instance of the 2nd Rowan County Regiment
On May 1, 1782, the Rowan County Regiment had grown very large and again was split into two parts—a 1st Rowan County Regiment and a 2nd Rowan County Regiment.  The 2nd Rowan County Regiment was led by Captains David Caldwell, Thomas Cowan, David Crawford, George Davidson, John Graham, Jacob Nichols, and James Purviance.  The only action that this instance of the unit saw was in the Cherokee Expedition in 1782.

Senior officers of the reconstituted 2nd Rowan County Regiment (May 1, 1782-end of war) include:
Colonel James Brandon
Lt. Col. David Caldwell
Maj. John Lopp
Maj. Jacob Nichols

Known company captains
Known captains are listed below:

James Armstrong
Waightstill Avery
James Barr
Christopher Beekman
William Beekman
Unknown Cain
Jonathan Kemp
John Connelly
Thomas Cowan
David Crawford
George Davidson
Samuel Davidson
William Davidson
William Lee Davidson
Jacob Eckles
Archibald Fleming
John Graham
James Gray
John Harden
Henry Highland
Robert Holmes
Thomas Kennedy
Thomas Lytle
Francis McCorkle
John McDowell
Joseph McDowell
William Moon
William Moore
James Morrison
Reuben Morrison
William Morrison
Peter Mull
William Neill
William Penland
James Purviance
David Robinson
James Roddy
Conrad Rudolph
John Russell
Leroy Taylor
Lewis Taylor
Joseph White
Reuben White
Thomas Whitson
Samuel Woods

References

Bibliography
 List of Taxables in Rowan County, North Carolina, 1778, Link, mentions several of the Captains of the 2nd Rowan County Regiment, after it was re-established 
Bibliography of the Continental Army in North Carolina compiled by the United States Army Center of Military History
 
North Carolina Department of Archives and History, North Carolina Revolutionary Army Accounts-Secretary of State Treasurer's and Comptroller's Papers Journal "A" (Public Accounts) 1775-1776.
 
 Volume 1, A-C
 Volume 2, D-G 
 Volume 3, H-K 
 Volume 4, L-O
 Volume 5, P-S
 Volume 6, T-Z, 
 
 
 
 
 

Rowan County
Rowan County, North Carolina
1775 establishments in North Carolina